Joan Sales i Vallès (1912-1983) was a Catalan writer, translator and publisher, who promoted Catalan culture under the Franco dictatorship. His best-known novel and major testament is Uncertain Glory (Catalan: Incerta Glòria).

Biography 
Joan Sales was born on 19 November 1912 in Barcelona. His father was originally from Vallclara (Conca de Barbarà) and his mother from Terrassa. Breaking with the conservative and traditionalist politics of his family, Sales became politically active at a young age and at the age of 15 he was imprisoned for three months for protesting against the Primo de Rivera dictatorship. He was involved in the foundation of the Partit Comunista Català in 1928 and it was here that he met his future wife Núria Folch i Pi. The PCC joined the Bloc Obrer i Camperol in 1931. However, Sales soon left the BOC, disillusioned with what he felt to be the party’s rigid discipline and its retreat from its Catalan roots. In 1932, Sales obtained a law degree and also became one of the first officially recognised teachers of Catalan.

With the outbreak of the Spanish Civil War, Sales enrolled in the Catalan Military Academy (Catalan: Escola de Guerra) and, as an officer, was sent first to the anarchist Durruti column in Madrid and then to a militarised battalion on the Aragon front. In 1938, he was arrested and imprisoned for several weeks by the Communist-controlled Military Investigation Service (described by his wife as the local version of the GPU) for not reporting two of his brothers who, having been called up for military service, had then disappeared. In fact, all the male members of the Sales family were detained including a German brother-in-law. Three of the six brothers in the family were to die of typhus, which was rife in the concentration camp where they were being held. Sales himself was acquitted of all charges and returned to the front. He was sent to a column which was among the last to resist Franco’s troops at the Balaguer bridgehead. He was then involved in a rearguard action protecting the chaotic Republican military and civilian retreat. In the final days of the war, he was promoted to the post of major.

Following the defeat of the Spanish Republic at the hands of the fascists, he was one of the last to take the road to exile and cross into France at the Col d’Ares. He was to spend nine years in exile: in France, the Dominican Republic and Mexico, where he worked as a typesetter. On his return to Catalonia in 1948, he began writing his great work, Uncertain Glory. He also dedicated himself to publishing books in Catalan, as far as that was possible within the constraints of Francoist censorship.

Joan Sales died in Barcelona in 1983 and was buried in Siurana, Priorat. His wife, Núria Folch, who died in 2010, was buried beside him. They were survived by their daughter, Núria Sales i Folch, a historian.

Publisher and translator 
As a publisher, Sales founded Club Editor and was actively involved in keeping Catalan culture and literature alive during the Franco dictatorship. He published a number of classics of Catalan literature: most notably, In Diamond Square (Catalan:La plaça del Diamant) by Mercè Rodoreda and The Doll's Room (Catalan: Bearn o la sala de les nines) by Llorenç Villalonga. He also published the poems of his great friend, Màrius Torres and a volume of their correspondence during the Civil War and the period of exile, Cartes a Màrius Torres. As a translator, Sales translated authors such as Dostoevsky, Kazantzakis and Mauriac into Catalan. The dostoevskian influence is evident in his great novel, Uncertain Glory.

Politics 
Sales was a convinced Christian Democrat and committed Catalan nationalist. Following his return from exile, he joined the Democratic Union of Catalonia (Catalan: Unió Democràtica de Catalunya). He explained that he became a Catholic during the Civil War, having seen so many corpses and that the UDC was the only party without any blood on its hands. He conceived his masterpiece, Uncertain Glory, as a testament to his dead comrades: "I sought to bear witness to that which I had experienced, against the black lie - the Falangists - and also the red lie - the Falangists first and then the Communists."

Works 
 1950 Rondalles escollides de Guimerà, Casaponce i Alcover (illustrated by Elvira Elias)
 1951 Rondalles gironines i valencianes (illustrated by Elvira Elias)
 1952 Rondalles d'ahir i avui (illustrated by Montserrat Casanova)
 1952 Viatge d'un moribund
 1953 Rondalles escollides de Ramon Llull, Mistral i Verdaguer (illustrated by d'Elvira Elias, preface from Carles Riba)
 1956 Uncertain Glory (Incerta glòria) 1971: uncensored, revised and expanded.
 1972 En Tirant lo Blanc a Grècia, òpera bufa
 1976 Cartes a Màrius Torres
 1983 Winds of the Night (El vent de nit)
 1986 Cartes de la guerra

Notes

References

External links 
 Joan Sales on webpage of Association of Catalan Writers (in English and Catalan)
 

1912 births
1983 deaths
Writers from Barcelona
War writers
Catalan-language writers